Radio of Chuvashia is a Chuvash radio station based in Cheboksary, broadcasting in many Chuvash Republic cities.

Director Elena Izhendeeva.

Shareholders structure
 All-Russia State Television and Radio Broadcasting Company

History

See also 
 Chuvash National Movement
 Chuvash national radio

References

External links
 Official site 
 Федеральное государственное унитарное предприятие "Государственная телевизионная и радиовещательная компания «Чувашия» (дочернее предприятие Всероссийской государственной телевизионной и радиовещательной компании), статья в интернет-версии Чувашской энциклопедии;
 Archives of the Chuvash television and radio ;
 Radio of Chuvashia, in the portal «Pressa of Chuvashia».

Radio stations in Russia
Chuvash-language radio stations
Cheboksary